The War of the Worlds is a 2019 three-part British science fiction drama television miniseries, produced by Mammoth Screen for the BBC, and co-produced with Creasun Media and Red Square. The series is an Edwardian period adaptation of H.G. Wells' 1898 science fiction novel of the same name, and is the first British television adaptation of Wells' Martian invasion novel. The War of the Worlds premiered in other countries before its UK broadcast on the BBC between 17 November and 1 December 2019.

Premise

Set in Edwardian England, the story follows journalist George (played by Rafe Spall) and his partner Amy (Eleanor Tomlinson), who works as an assistant to local scientist Ogilvy (Robert Carlyle). They start a life together in the town of Woking, in defiance of the norms of British society, due to George already being married to a wife who is not willing to grant a divorce. They then face an invasion of Britain, and possibly the whole of planet Earth, from Mars, while also attempting to survive against an powerful enemy unable to be fought with human resources.

Cast

Main
 Eleanor Tomlinson as Amy
 Rafe Spall as George
 Rupert Graves as Frederick
 Nicholas Le Prevost as Chamberlain
 Harry Melling as Artilleryman
 Jonathan Aris as Priest
 Robert Carlyle as Ogilvy

Recurring and guest
 Susan Wooldridge as Mrs Elphinstone
 Charlie De'Ath as Greaves
 Joey Batey as Henderson
 Freya Allan as Mary
 Daniel Cerqueira as Stent
 Aisling Jarrett-Gavin as Lucy
 Woody Norman as George Junior
 Reid Anderson as Stall Holder

Episodes

Production

Development
The War of the Worlds was first announced in December 2015, with the BBC confirming production of the series in May 2017. The series was produced by Mammoth Screen for the BBC, co-produced with Creasun Media, in association with Red Square.

Writer Peter Harness expanded the role of the narrator's wife, stating "I think the clearest choice that I made from the start of this project was to give the male character a wife who had strength of character in her own right [...] It was very important to me to make the female character three-dimensional".

The three-part series was directed by Craig Viveiros, produced by Betsan Morris Evans, executive produced by Damien Timmer, Preethi Mavahalli, Peter Harness, and Viveiros from Mammoth Screen, Tommy Bulfin from the BBC, Minglu Ma from Creasun and Jamie Brown from Red Square.

The interpretation makes use of time-shifting forwards and backwards in the timeline in order to "throw in a clever touch of time-shifting into the narrative to upend audience expectations".

Filming
Filming began in April 2018 in Liverpool. Locations include St George's Plateau, Eldon Grove, Vauxhall (where an abandoned building was used as a London location), Sir Thomas Street, Dale Street, Ainsdale Woods, Delamere Forest, the village of Great Budworth in Cheshire, the Palm House at Sefton Park, and Croxteth Hall. Filming and post-production were completed by May 2019.

Release

Marketing
The first footage from the BBC drama appeared in July 2018, followed by trailers in January 2019, with the first, longer trailer for the drama being released in September 2019.

Broadcast
The programme was released in the UK in three weekly episodes. Originally set to premiere in the UK during Christmas 2018, The War of the Worlds actually premiered in Canada on T+E between 6 and 20 October 2019. It was also broadcast in two parts instead of three on New Zealand's TVNZ 1 between 13 and 20 October 2019. Mammoth Screen announced in September 2019 that the programme was expected to be released in the UK in late 2019; the first episode had its UK premiere on 17 November 2019.

ITV Studios Global Entertainment is responsible for the international distribution of The War of the Worlds miniseries. It has been sold to major European countries and African territories.

Critical reception

The War of the Worlds has received mixed reviews from critics. The series holds a 67% approval rating at the review aggregator website Rotten Tomatoes, based on 21 critic reviews. The site's consensus reads, "Respectful, if not exactly riveting, Craig Viveiros' reimagined The War of the Worldss wandering narrative undermines its strong performances".

The Guardian gave the drama four stars, deeming it a "solid and reliable" drama, but criticized the plot's pacing, stating it had a "lack of urgency". The Independent gave it three stars but complained about its attempts to speak to contemporary political issues, stating, "The real war here is not between humans and aliens, but between a classic tale and the perceived liberal expectations of audiences in 2019". The Telegraph gave the first episode two stars and criticized it for appearing low budget and the performances by Tomlinson and Spall. The Irish Independent was unfavorable to the first episode and called it a "massive disappointment". The Telegraph was more negative towards the second episode, giving it one star. The Independent was also more negative towards the third episode, giving it two stars. James Delingpole in The Spectator responded negatively to the series, calling it “incredibly sad”.

References

External links
 
 

2010s British crime drama television series
2010s British science fiction television series
2019 British television series debuts
2019 British television series endings
Alien invasions in television
BBC television dramas
English-language television shows
Television shows based on British novels
Television series about extraterrestrial life
Television series by ITV Studios
Television series by Mammoth Screen
Television shows set in England
Works based on The War of the Worlds
Television shows shot in Liverpool